Catfoss is a hamlet in the East Riding of Yorkshire, England, in an area known as Holderness. Catfoss Lane, between Catfoss and Brandesburton, is the location of the former RAF Catfoss, an airfield which is now home to a variety of businesses.

It forms part of the civil parish of Seaton.

References

External links 

 Catfoss Group

Villages in the East Riding of Yorkshire
Holderness